Eudaemon was an ancient city in Arabia, modern day Aden.

Eudaemon or Eudaimonia may also refer to:

 Eudaemon (mythology), a type of daemon in Greek mythology
 Eudaimonia, a concept in Aristotelian ethics and political philosophy
 Eudaemons, a 1970s group of physicists named after the Aristotelian concept
 Eudaemonia (moth), a genus of moths native to sub-Saharan Africa

See also
 Eudaimonisma, a genus of moths native to Australia